Yakhontov is a Russian masculine surname originating from the old Russian word yakhont, which referred to a precious stone such as ruby or sapphire; its feminine counterpart is Yakhontova. It may refer to
Alexander Yakhontov (1879–1973), Russian entomologist 
Sergei Yakhontov (1926–2018), Russian linguist

References

Russian-language surnames